Nuclear sexing is a technique for genetic sex determination in those species where XX chromosome pair is present. Nuclear sexing can be done by identifying Barr body, a drumstick like appendage located in the rim of the nucleus in somatic cells. Barr body is the inactive X chromosome which lies condensed in the nucleus of somatic cells. A typical human (or other XY-based organism) female has only one Barr body per somatic cell, while a typical human male has none. Though a Barr body can be sought in any human nucleated cell, circulating mononuclear cells are commonly used for this purpose. These cells are cultured, and treated with chemicals such as colcemid to arrest mitosis in metaphase.
A minimum of 30 percent of sex chromatin indicates genetic female sex.

References

Sex-determination systems
Genetics